Robert McCarthy (born 11 February 1924) is an Australian former tennis player. He reached the quarter finals in men's singles with Adrian Quist at the 1948 Australian Championships.

References

External links 
 
 

1924 births
Possibly living people
Australian male tennis players
Place of birth missing (living people)